This is a list of the squads for the 2006 CONCACAF Women's U-20 Championship, which was held in Mexico between January 18 and January 27, 2006. The 8 national teams involved in the tournament were required to register a squad of 20 players each, two of whom must be goalkeepers; only players in these squads were eligible to take part in the tournament.

Group A

Canada 

Coach:  Ian Bridge

Mexico 

Coach:  Leonardo Cuéllar

Panama 

Coach:  Noel Deveaux

Trinidad and Tobago 

Coach:  Jamaal Shabazz

Group B

El Salvador 

Coach:  José Ricardo Herrera

Jamaica 

Coach:  Vin Blaine

Suriname 

Coach:  Kenneth Jaliens

United States 

Coach:  Tim Schulz

References

External links 
CONCACAF 2006 Women's Under-20 Tournament Recap

squads